Raquel Carriedo-Tomás (born 8 February 1971) is a Spanish professional golfer.

In 2000, she became the first Spaniard to play for Europe in the Solheim Cup. Carriedo-Tomás was also a member of the team in 2002, and she topped the Ladies European Tour Order of Merit in 2001.

Professional wins (4)

Ladies European Tour wins (4)
2001 Taiwan Ladies Open, Compaq Open, Waterford Crystal Ladies' Irish Open
2002 Tenerife Ladies Open

Team appearances
Professional
Solheim Cup (representing Europe): 2000 (winners), 2002

External links
Golf Today report on first professional tournament victory, the 2001 Taiwan Open

Spanish female golfers
Ladies European Tour golfers
Solheim Cup competitors for Europe
Sportspeople from Zaragoza
1971 births
Living people
20th-century Spanish women
21st-century Spanish women